The men's featherweight (68 kilograms) event at the 2014 Asian Games took place on 2 October 2014 at Ganghwa Dolmens Gymnasium, Incheon, South Korea.

Schedule
All times are Korea Standard Time (UTC+09:00)

Results 
Legend
R — Won by referee stop contest
W — Won by withdrawal

Final

Top half

Bottom half

References

External links
Official website

Taekwondo at the 2014 Asian Games